Karmrashen is an abandoned village in the southern part of the Aragatsotn Province of Armenia, south of the Ashnak village.

GEOnet Names Server classed it as an Armenian populated place in 1998.

Names 
Variant forms of spelling for Karmrashen include:

 Karaburun
 Karmrashen
 Karaburun
 Karmrashen

Elevation 
Karmrashen is elevated 1135 meters above sea level.

References

Former populated places in Aragatsotn Province